Uhunoma Naomi-Pauline Osazuwa (born November 23, 1987, in Oakland, California) is a Nigerian track and field athlete competing in the heptathlon. She represented Nigeria at the 2012 Summer Olympics but failed to finish the competition after recording marks in five events. She qualified for 2016 Rio Olympics in the heptathlon, finishing in 29th place.

She received her doctor of pharmacy degree in 2014 from the University of Michigan College of Pharmacy.

Competition record

NCAA record

References

External links
IAAF profile for Uhunoma Osazuwa

Living people
1987 births
Track and field athletes from Oakland, California
Nigerian heptathletes
Nigerian female sprinters
Olympic athletes of Nigeria
Athletes (track and field) at the 2012 Summer Olympics
Athletes (track and field) at the 2015 African Games
Athletes (track and field) at the 2016 Summer Olympics
World Athletics Championships athletes for Nigeria
Syracuse Orange women's track and field athletes
American sportspeople of Nigerian descent
African Games gold medalists for Nigeria
African Games medalists in athletics (track and field)
African Games silver medalists for Nigeria
University of Michigan College of Pharmacy alumni
Competitors at the 2011 Summer Universiade
21st-century Nigerian women